The Mittelhorn (3,704 m) is a peak in the Swiss Alps close to the village of Grindelwald. It is the highest of the three composing the Wetterhorner massif.

See also
List of mountains of Switzerland

References

External links 

 Mittelhorn on Hikr
 www.wetterhorn.ch
 Wetterhorn on Summitpost
 Wetterhorn from Grindelwald First
 Wetterhorn from Eiger Trail

Mountains of Switzerland
Mountains of the Alps
Alpine three-thousanders
Bernese Alps
Mountains of the canton of Bern